Burton is a city in Washington County, Texas, United States. The population was 359 at the 2000 census. Prior to the 2010 census, Burton changed its status from a town to a city. The population was 300 at the 2010 census.

History

Burton was established in 1870 by John M. Burton; a native of Greensboro, Georgia.  In June 1869 Burton sold land to trustees of the Houston and Texas Central Railroad and then sold to citizens. The arrival of the railroad after the Civil War benefited the community. The town received its first postmaster on September 23, 1870.  By 1910 its population was 600. The community was incorporated on October 25, 1972.

Geography

According to the United States Census Bureau, the town has a total area of 1.2 square miles (3.1 km), all of it land.

Burton lies on Highway 290 between Austin and Houston.

Demographics

At the 2000 census, there were 359 people, 153 households, and 93 families in the town. The population density was 301.7 people per square mile (116.5/km). There were 194 housing units at an average density of 163.1 per square mile (62.9/km). The racial makeup of the town was 67.13% White, 25.35% African American, 0.56% Native American, 1.95% Asian, 3.34% from other races, and 1.67% from two or more races. Hispanic or Latino of any race were 3.34% of the population.

Of the 153 households 20.9% had children under the age of 18 living with them, 54.2% were married couples living together, 5.9% had a female householder with no husband present, and 38.6% were non-families. 35.9% of households were one person and 19.0% were one person aged 65 or older. The average household size was 2.35 and the average family size was 3.11.

The age distribution was 23.7% under the age of 18, 9.7% from 18 to 24, 24.0% from 25 to 44, 18.4% from 45 to 64, and 24.2% 65 or older. The median age was 40 years. For every 100 females, there were 105.1 males. For every 100 females age 18 and over, there were 94.3 males.

The median household income was $38,875 and the median family income  was $47,321. Males had a median income of $26,406 versus $16,500 for females. The per capita income for the town was $16,496. 7.8% of the population and 3.0% of families were below the poverty line. Out of the total people living in poverty, 9.7% are under the age of 18 and 12.3% are 65 or older.

Education
The Town of Burton is served by the Burton Independent School District.

Texas Cotton Gin Museum and Festival

Burton is home to the Texas Cotton Gin Museum, which is located at the Burton Farmers Gin. The gin was built in 1914 and is considered to be the oldest working cotton gin in the country. Every year in the Spring, the Texas Cotton Gin Museum hosts the Burton Cotton Gin Festival. During the annual festival, the cotton gin runs, powered by a 16-ton, 125-horsepower 1925 Bessemer engine called "Lady B."

Dance Hall
La Bahia Turn Verein hall is located about 5 miles southwest of the town of Burton. This hall hosts a regular antique fair, as well as traditional dances.

References

Cities in Texas
Cities in Washington County, Texas